The Morane-Saulnier TRK (aka Morane-Saulnier MoS-9) was a prototype French bomber built during World War I.

Design
The Morane-Saulnier TRK was a large triplane with the engines mounted in the fuselage, facing outboard and canted upwards. The engines drove a propeller each, through driveshafts and bevel gearboxes, with the propeller gearboxes strut mounted beneath the middle mainplanes. Cooling for the engines was provided by a tall radiator stack above the centre of the fuselage, between the middle and upper mainplanes. The two tractor propellers ran just forward of the middle mainplanes.

Two pilots sat in open cockpits side-by-side in the nose of the aircraft, which also had a wind-driven generator at the very tip. The third crew-member was housed in the rear fuselage and attended the engines in flight or operated defensive armament. The fixed undercarriage was of the conventional contemporary tail-skid type, with a nose-over protection wheel, strut-mounted under the nose. The left and right, strut-supported, mainwheel assemblies were of very wide track, with a wheel at each end of both axles.

Specifications (TRK)

References

Further reading

1910s French bomber aircraft
Racing aircraft
Aircraft first flown in 1915
Triplanes
Twin piston-engined tractor aircraft